Bad Men's Money is a 1929 American silent Western film directed by J.P. McGowan and starring Yakima Canutt, Peggy Montgomery and John Lowell.

Cast
 Yakima Canutt as Jim Donovan
 Peggy Montgomery as Helen Saunders
 J.P. McGowan as Sheriff Bud Jennings
 Slim Whitaker as Percival McGinnis
 Bud Osborne as Take a Chance Harris
 John Lowell as George Masters
 Lew Meehan as Bluff Hardcastle

Production
Bad Men's Money was the first of three movies that McGowan wrote for Yakima Canutt.

References

External links
 

1929 films
1929 Western (genre) films
American black-and-white films
Films directed by J. P. McGowan
Silent American Western (genre) films
1920s English-language films
1920s American films